Synchthonius elegans is a species of mites. It is found in Europe.

References 

 Synchthonius elegans at fauna-eu.org

Sarcoptiformes
Animals described in 1957